We Once Were is the third studio album from Christian rock band Rush of Fools. It was released on September 27, 2011 on eOne Christian Music.

The lead single, "Grace Found Me" was released June 24, 2011.

Track listing
"We Once Were" - 3:50
"Come Find Me" - 3:02
"A Civil War" - 4:27
"Won't Say Goodbye" - 3:19
"Grace Found Me" - 3:00
"You're the Medicine" - 3:55
"End Of Me" - 2:59
"No Other Love" - 3:21
"Beginning to End" - 3:18
"The Wrong Things" - 3:36
"Help Our Unbelief" - 4:08
"Inside and Outside" - 5:20

References

2011 albums
Rush of Fools albums